The W. S. Carmichael House is a private house located at 301 Jackson Street in Petoskey, Michigan. It was placed on the National Register of Historic Places in 1986.

The W. S. Carmichael House is a two-story cross-gabled Queen Anne building with a single story shed-roofed addition filling the angle of the walls in the rear. The single story front porch has a truncated hipped roof, and has decorative turned elements. The building is covered with clapboard, with the gables ornamented with decorative fishscale shingles. he windows are one-over-one double-hung units with cornices above.

This house was constructed by 1899, and is associated with W.S. Carmichael, a carpenter who lived in the house for many years.

References

Houses on the National Register of Historic Places in Michigan
Queen Anne architecture in Michigan
Houses completed in 1899
Houses in Emmet County, Michigan